Ties to Rachel is a 1997 drama film directed, written and produced by Jon Resnik and starring Joanna Adler and Arija Bareikis.

Cast
Joanna Adler
Arija Bareikis
Arthur Bridgers
George Dickerson
Tim Hopper
Ellen Parker
Adrian Pasdar
Beverly Pereira
Molly Price
Bill Raymond
Joshua Taylor

External links

1997 films
1997 drama films
American drama films
1990s English-language films
1990s American films